Martin Seiferth (born 18 September 1990) is a retired German professional basketball player who played until 2020 for the Paderborn Baskets of the German ProA league. He formerly played for Alba Berlin of the German Basketball League. Prior to his professional career, Seiferth played with the Oregon and Eastern Washington men's basketball teams. He commonly plays the role as a forward-center, transforming into an elite shot-blocker in the Big Sky Conference. Seiferth redshirted his sophomore year in college due to NCAA transfer rules.

The first club he competed with was Marzahner Basket Bären, joining in 2006. Seiferth helped the Alba Berlin youth team win the Nachwuchs Basketball Bundesliga League (NBBL) in the 2008–09 season after finishing as runners-up at the conclusion of the team's preceding year.

References

External links
 Martin Seiferth at espn.com
 Martin Seiferth at euroleague.net

1990 births
Living people
Alba Berlin players
Centers (basketball)
Eastern Washington Eagles men's basketball players
German expatriate basketball people in the United States
German men's basketball players
NINERS Chemnitz players
Oregon Ducks men's basketball players
Paderborn Baskets players
Basketball players from Berlin
USC Heidelberg players